Beverley Mitchell is the self-titled debut album from American actress and singer, Beverley Mitchell. It was released on January 23, 2007. She co-wrote eight songs for the album. The first single, "Angel", was released in late 2006. The album debuted at No. 30 on the Billboard Top Country Albums chart and No. 8 on the Heatseekers chart.

Track listing

Track information verified from the album's liner notes.

Personnel
Lisa Cochran, Chip Davis, Jonell Mosser, Russell Terrell: Vocal Backing
J. T. Corenflos, Chris Leuzinger, Kenny Vaughn: Guitars
Mike Johnson: Pedal Steel
Joe Spivey: Fiddle & Mandolin
Mike Rojas: Keyboards
Mike Brignardello: Bass
Greg Morrow, Lonnie Wilson: Drums
Tom Roady: Percussion

Production
Produced by D. Scott Miller
Engineered by Adam Crawford, Patrick Murphy & Brian Reeves, with assistance from Jason "Recon" Coons
Mixed by Kevin Beamish
Mastered by Randy LeRoy

Charts

References

2007 debut albums
Beverley Mitchell albums